Spilman may refer to:

People
Byrd Spilman Dewey (1856–1942), American author, land investor, and town founder
Harry Spilman (born 1954), American baseball player
Hendrik Spilman (1721–1784), Dutch painter and engraver
John Spilman (died 1626), German-born papermaker and jeweller in England
Jonathan E. Spilman (1812–1896), American lawyer, minister, and composer
Tom Spilman (born ?), American computer programmer, game developer, and businessman

Places
Spilman, West Virginia, an unincorporated community in the United States

See also
Spillman (disambiguation)
Spillmann
Spielmann
Szpilman
Spellman
Spelman (disambiguation)